The Oxford Belles are an all-female a cappella group from The University of Oxford and Oxford Brookes University.   The group performs on a regular basis in and around Oxford and London, primarily at balls and charity events, occasionally with other Oxford University a cappella groups such as The Oxford Gargoyles and Out of the Blue.

History 

The Belles were formed in 1995 by Helen Whiteley, a year-long visiting student from the University of Virginia, who had previously sung with The Virginia Belles. Helen was eager to continue the a cappella tradition, hugely popular in the US, on the east side of the Atlantic.

In the 2008 quarterfinals of the International Championship of Collegiate A Cappella, the Belles were awarded prizes for Best Choreography (for their rendition of Blondie's "One Way Or Another"), and Lauren Bensted was awarded the prize for Best Arrangement. In the semi-finals, Joanna Langilie's solo in "One Way Or Another" was highly commended. In 2009, the Belles reached the final of The Voice Festival UK (VF-UK), which established them for that year as the most successful all-female a cappella group in the UK.

In 2017, the Belles received some recognition for the International Women's Day cover of Girls Just Wanna Have Fun.

References

External links
 Official website of The Oxford Belles
 

Collegiate a cappella groups
Music in Oxford
Clubs and societies of the University of Oxford
Musical groups established in 1995
Musical groups from Oxford
1995 establishments in England
English women singers